Randall Hicks is an American writer and attorney.

Early life 
Randall Bruce Hicks was born in Orange, California. He worked as an actor, under the screen name, Randy Shepard, in small TV and film roles commencing in 1980: When Hell Was in Session (TV movie), Cutter's Way (film) and Escape! (network TV pilot). In 1982 he moved to Nice, France and worked as an English teacher, before returning to the United States to attend law school and commencing the practice of law in 1986, graduating from Pepperdine University School of Law.

Legal career 

Randall Hicks's legal career has been focused on adoption law and he has authored several books on that subject.

Writing career 

Hicks's first books were non-fiction on the subject of adoption. His first novel, The Baby Game, won the 2006 Gumshoe Award and was a finalist for the Anthony Award, Barry Award and Macavity Award (Best First Novel).

Bibliography

Non-Fiction Books 

 Adopting in California (1992)
 Adopting in California, Revised Edition (1999)
 ADOPTING IN AMERICA: How To Adopt Within One Year (five editions, 1992–2011)
 ADOPTION: The Essential Guide to Adopting Quickly and Safely (2007)
 STEP PARENTING: 50 One-Minute DOs & DON'Ts for Stepdads & Stepmoms (2016)

Fiction Books 

 The Baby Game (2005)
 Baby Crimes (2007)

Children's Books 

 Adoption Stories for Young Children (1995)

References

American male writers
American lawyers
1956 births
Living people